Bethune Memorial House, a National Historic Site of Canada in Gravenhurst, Ontario, Canada, commemorates the life and achievements of Dr. Norman Bethune. Impatient and restless, he was inspired by a sense of duty to others and a love of the outdoors. In Bethune, these characteristics were the seeds of a battlefront surgeon, communist, humanitarian, inventor, teacher and artist. The historic site explores the roots and examines his legacy. Dr. Bethune spent the last two years of his life in China, serving as a teacher and as a surgeon of the communist Eighth Route Army.

History
The house was built in 1880 to serve as the manse of Knox Presbyterian Church. Malcolm Bethune became the minister of Knox Church in 1889 and, a year later, his son Norman was born in the manse. The Bethune family remained in Gravenhurst until 1893, when they moved to Beaverton, Ontario. Thereafter, the house was occupied by a succession of ministers.

In 1973, the house was purchased by the federal government's Department of External Affairs. Restoration of the building was subsequently undertaken by Parks Canada, which is now responsible for its operation.

In August 2002, then-Governor General Adrienne Clarkson visited the house and also unveiled a bronze statue of Dr. Bethune erected by the Town of Gravenhurst. The statue is located on Gravenhurst's main street, alongside the notable Opera House.

Affiliations
The museum is affiliated with the Canadian Museums Association, the Canadian Heritage Information Network, and the Virtual Museum of Canada.

See also 
 Norman Bethune Memorial (Montreal)

References

External links

 
 Norman Bethune Memorial Sites

Norman Bethune
Museums in the District Municipality of Muskoka
Birthplaces of individual people
Biographical museums in Canada
National Historic Sites in Ontario
Historic house museums in Ontario